Ilisapeci Delaiwau is a Fijian rugby union player.

Biography 
Delaiwau was selected in the Fijiana squad for the 2022 Oceania Championship in New Zealand. She scored four tries as Fiji trounced Papua New Guinea 152–0. She also scored tries in the tests against Tonga and Samoa.

In September 2022, She was selected for the Fijiana squad to the 2021 Rugby World Cup in New Zealand.

References 

Year of birth missing (living people)
Living people
Female rugby union players
Fijian female rugby union players
Fiji women's international rugby union players